Pyledriver (foaled 14 March 2017) is a British Thoroughbred racehorse. After showing promise as a two-year-old in 2019, when he won two of four races including the Listed Ascendant Stakes, he improved in the following year to become a top-class middle-distance performer, winning the King Edward VII Stakes and the Great Voltigeur Stakes as well as finishing third in the St Leger. In 2021 he recorded his first Group 1 victory in the Coronation Cup. In 2022 he registered an upset victory the King George VI and Queen Elizabeth Stakes.

Background
Pyledriver is a brown horse with a white blaze and three white socks, bred in England by Roger Devlin in partnership with Knox & Wells Ltd a company owned by the brothers Guy and Hugh Leach. As a foal in December 2017 he was consigned to the Tattersalls sales but failed to reach his reserve price of 10,000 guineas. The colt was sent into training with William Muir at the Linkslade stable  Lambourn in Berkshire.

He was from the fourth crop of foals sired by Harbour Watch, who was undefeated in three starts including the Richmond Stakes. Harbour Watch's other offspring have included Waikuku (Stewards' Cup), Baron Samedi (Belmont Gold Cup Stakes), and Tis Marvellous (Prix Robert Papin). Pyledriver's dam La Pyle, showed modest racing ability, winning two minor races in France before competing without success over hurdles in Britain. She was a half-sister to the Grand Prix de Paris winner Mount Ormel and, as a descendant of the broodmare Licata, a distant relative of Akiyda and Acamas. He has been ridden in most of his races by Martin Dwyer.

Racing career

2019: two-year-old season
Pyledriver made his debut in a novice race over seven furlongs on firm ground at Salisbury Racecourse on 13 July. He started a 50/1 but belied his odds as he produced a strong late run to gain the advantage in the closing stages and win "comfortably" by three quarters of a length from the favourite Great Ambassador. The colt was stepped up in class for the Listed Washington Singer Stakes on soft ground over the same trip at Newbury Racecourse on 17 August and came home fourth of the five runners behind the Mark Johnston-trained Thunderous, beaten three and a half lengths by the winner. Three weeks later Pyledriver was partnered by P. J. McDonald when he was moved up to one mile for the Listed Ascendant Stakes at Haydock Park and started at odds of 14/1 in an eight-runner field. After tracking the leaders he took the lead two furlongs from the finish and "stayed on well" to win by one and a quarter lengths. On his final appearance of the season the colt ran poorly in the Group 2 Royal Lodge Stakes at Ascot Racecourse, finishing tailed-off last of the eight runners. Muir explained that Pyledriver had lost some of his strength having grown throughout the summer.

2020: three-year-old season
The flat racing season in Great Britain was disrupted by the COVID-19 Pandemic with racing being suspended in spring and many major races being rescheduled. Pyledriver began his season by starting a 40/1 outsider for the Classic Trial Stakes which was run behind closed doors on polytrack at Kempton Park Racecourse on 3 June. After being restrained in the early stages he stayed on well in the straight to take second place behind Berlin Tango. The Grade 2 King Edward VII Stakes over one and a half miles at Royal Ascot usually takes place two weeks or so after the Epsom Derby but in 2020 the Epsom classic was postponed by a month, meaning that the Ascot race on 16 June became a major Derby trial. With Dwyer in the saddle Pyledriver went off the 18/1 fifth choice in a six-runner field which was headed by the Aidan O'Brien-trained Mogul and also included the Stonehenge Stakes winner Mohican Heights. Pyledriver was always traveling well, overtook the front-running Sound of Cannons in the straight and stayed on well to win by two lengths from Arthur's Kingdom. After the race Muir said "he was just weak as a kitten last year. I was quite confident that this horse would run a massive race as he had really come to himself over the past three or four days... he started to spark and he was bouncing." Going on discuss the colt's prospects of contesting the Epsom Derby he added "I will monitor the horse... We have three weeks and if he does well we can go there".

Pyledriver started at odds of 16/1 for the 241st running of the Derby on 4 July and finished eleventh of the sixteen runners behind Serpentine, having never looked likely to win after being hampered in the early stages. On 19 August at York Racecourse the colt contested the Group 2 Great Voltigeur Stakes went off the 10/1 fifth choice in an eight-runner field, with those preferred in the betting being Mogul, Darain, Roberto Escobarr and Berkshire Rocco. Pyledriver raced towards the rear before making "rapid progress" in the straight, taking the lead two furlongs out, and winning "comfortably" by three and a half lengths from Highland Chief. Muir commented "I knew the horse had got stronger since Epsom... I could only see him getting stronger next year and he looks a great horse for the future," while Dwyer said "Pyledriver won that like a Group 1 horse and I'm pleased he's back in business. Epsom was a write-off as he was interfered with after a furlong and never ran his race."

In the 244th running of the St Leger over fourteen and a half furlongs at Doncaster Racecourse on 12 September and Pyledriver started the 9/2 fourth choice of the eleven runners. He came from the rear of the field to move into contention in the straight and despite swerving to the left in the closing stages he kept on well to finish third behind Galileo Chrome and Berkshire Rocco. For his final run of the year he was dropped back in distance and matched against older horses in the Champion Stakes over ten furlongs at Ascot on 17 October when he came home seventh of the ten runners behind the six-year-old gelding Addeybb.

In the 2020 World's Best Racehorse Rankings, Pyledriver was rated the fifty-seventh best racehorse in the world.

2021: four-year-old season
For the 2021 season Pyledriver was trained by Muir in partnership with Chris Grassick. The colt began his third campaign on 1 May at Newmarket Racecourse when he finished second to Sir Ron Priestley in the Group 2 Jockey Club Stakes. Dwyer reported that the horse had "ducked both ways away from the whip in the closing stages". The colt then returned to Group 1 class and started at 8/1 for the Coronation Cup over one and a half miles at Epsom on 4 June. The Aston Park Stakes winner Al Aasy started favourite while the other four runners were Japan, Mogul, Highland Chief and the filly Albaflora (Buckhounds Stakes). Pyledriver started well, settled in second place behind Highland Chief, went to the front at half way and maintained his lead into the last quarter mile. A furlong out he was challenged and overtaken by Al Aasy but rallied "gamely" to regain the advantage in the final strides and win by a neck. After the race Dwyer said "It was a tremendous race to ride in and I would imagine it would be the same to watch; they're two very tough horses. I don't know what came over me but I was a bit emotional. It's getting harder and harder as all the good horses are with the biggest trainers, and I think that's why people like seeing horses like him and owners who are sporting getting the rewards as they're the underdogs."

Pedigree

References

External links
 Career 1-2-3 Colour Chart – Pyledriver

2017 racehorse births
Racehorses bred in the United Kingdom
Racehorses trained in the United Kingdom
Thoroughbred family 13-c
King George VI and Queen Elizabeth Stakes winners